The District Court for the Northern Mariana Islands (in case citations, D. N. Mar. I.) is a federal territorial court whose jurisdiction comprises the United States-affiliated Commonwealth of the Northern Mariana Islands (CNMI). It was established by Act of Congress in 1977, pursuant to an international agreement between the United States and the CNMI that brought the CNMI under United States sovereignty. The court began hearing cases in January 1978. The court regularly sits in Saipan but may sit elsewhere in the CNMI. The court has the same jurisdiction as United States district courts, including diversity jurisdiction and bankruptcy jurisdiction. However, the District Court is not an Article III U.S. District Court, and because of that its judge is appointed for a 10-year term instead of for life. Appeals are taken to the Ninth Circuit.

Like most federal judges, judges in this court are appointed by the President, subject to Senate confirmation.  Judges may serve more than one term, subject to the standard nominating process.

The United States is represented in civil and criminal litigation in the court by the United States Attorney's Office for the District of the Northern Mariana Islands.

The first District Judge appointed was Alfred Laureta, who served from 1978 until 1988. His successor, Alex R. Munson, was nominated by President Ronald Reagan, and confirmed by the Senate in 1988. Munson was nominated for a second ten-year term by President Bill Clinton and was confirmed by the Senate in 1998.  He took senior status effective February 28, 2010. On January 26, 2011, President Obama nominated Ramona Villagomez Manglona to be Judge for the District Court for the Northern Mariana Islands for a term of ten years. The U.S. Senate confirmed her nomination by voice vote on July 26, 2011 and she received her commission on July 29, 2011. Although her ten-year term ended on July 28, 2021, she is allowed to continue serving until her successor is chosen and qualified.

The District Court for the Northern Mariana Islands was established by Pub.

Current judges
:

Vacancy and pending nomination

Former judges

See also
 List of current United States district judges
 List of United States federal courthouses in the Northern Mariana Islands
 United States Attorney for the Districts of Guam and the Northern Mariana Islands
 District Court of Guam

References

External links 
 District Court for the Northern Mariana Islands Official Website

Government of the Northern Mariana Islands
Northern Mariana Islands
1977 establishments in the Northern Mariana Islands
Courts and tribunals established in 1977